Christopher W. Klaus (born 1973 in Sarasota, Florida) is an American technology entrepreneur. He was founder and CTO of Internet Security Systems (ISS), a company which he started in the early 1990s, and then sold to IBM in 2006 for $1.3B. As of 2016, he is the CEO of Kaneva, a game company which he founded in 2004, and also the main financier for multiple business accelerators in the Atlanta area; including being a part of the Atlanta Technology Angels.

History
Klaus formed ISS in the early 1990s as a student at the Georgia Institute of Technology, eventually dropping out to focus on the growing company. In 2004 he stepped down from his role of Chief Technology Officer of ISS to pursue other interests, although he remained a significant shareholder and retained his role as the company's Chief Security Advisor. In 2006 ISS was sold to IBM for $1.3B.

Around 2007 Klaus became one of Georgia Tech's most visible contributors, giving a $15M naming gift to build the College of Computing's new home, the Klaus Advanced Computing Building.

In July 2014, Klaus co-founded NeuroLaunch, a business accelerator focused towards neurotech companies in Atlanta. In October 2015, he financed and co-founded another accelerator, CyberLaunch, which focuses on cybersecurity and machine learning startups.

Klaus's ex-wife, Crissy, is also a prominent figure through fifteen years of work in local marketing and real estate, as well as extensive work with non-profit organizations. She recently founded Fio360, Atlanta's first eco-early care center.

References

Living people
1973 births
Georgia Tech alumni
Chief technology officers of computer security companies
American chief technology officers
American technology chief executives
People from Sarasota, Florida